Mariano Piña Olaya (Champusco, Puebla, March 29, 1933) is a Mexican politician who served as the Governor of Puebla from 1987 to 1993.

Career
Piña Olaya studied the law in the National Autonomous University of Mexico. As a member of the Institutional Revolutionary Party he served as Federal Deputy in the LII Legislature from 1982 to 1985, in which he occupied the position of President of the Great Commission. Piña Olaya became governor of the State of Puebla in 1987 and served until 1993, but was viewed as weak and unpopular. Later, he became general director of the former Mexican Light and Power Company, and then sub-coordinator of Public Security during the six-year term of the President Carlos Salinas.

References

1933 births
Living people
Institutional Revolutionary Party politicians
Members of the Chamber of Deputies (Mexico) for Puebla
Presidents of the Chamber of Deputies (Mexico)
Governors of Puebla
People from Puebla
Deputies of the LII Legislature of Mexico